Dreyfusia is a genus of true bugs belonging to the family Adelgidae.

Species:
 Dreyfusia merkeri
 Dreyfusia nebrodensis
 Dreyfusia nordmannianae
 Dreyfusia  piceae
 Dreyfusia prelli

References

Adelgidae